Mercury is a 2016 novel by Scottish author Margot Livesey. It concerns a 40-something couple, Donald and Viv, whose marriage suffers due to their dissatisfaction with their lives.

References

2016 British novels
Novels set in Massachusetts
Cambridge, Massachusetts
HarperCollins books